Kim Sa-rang (born January 12, 1978) is a South Korean actress and model. She is most known for her roles in the television series Secret Garden with Hyun Bin, A Love to Kill with Rain, and This is My Love with Joo Jin-mo. She is also known for being crowned Miss Korea in 2000 and representing South Korea in Miss Universe 2001, the 50th Miss Universe pageant in Puerto Rico. She won 'Best National Costume' Hanbok. In 2015, she became a free agent after leaving Brave Entertainment.

Early life and education 

Kim Sa-rang was born on January 12, 1978, in South Korea. She graduated from Gwangyoung Girls' High School. Kim earned both a bachelor's and master's degree in traditional Korean music at Yong In University. She has one younger brother.

Career

Kim Sa-rang made her acting debut in 2000 in the television drama series Anger of Angel, which garnered positive reviews. In 2001 she was cast in the television drama series How Should I Be. That same year, she got her first big role in a television drama series entitled Mina which was again met with positive reviews and she was considered a rising star. In 2003, she appeared in Thousand Years of Love. Her other roles in television include appearances in A Love to Kill, The King and I, Tokyo Sun Shower and Secret Garden. She was last seen in the TV drama series This is My Love. Kim made her first movie debut in 2002 with Man is Born. Following this, Kim also starred in Love: Impossible, Who Slept with Her? and Radio Dayz. She has also appeared in several K-pop music videos including "Because You're My Woman" and "Demon".

Miss Korea 
Kim was crowned Miss Korea on May 28, 2000, at the Sejong Cultural Center, the site of the 1980 Miss Universe Pageant. She represented Korea in the Miss Universe Pageant 2001. During the pageant, she won the award for Best National Costume, which was a Korean hanbok dress.

Filmography

Film

Television series

Music video appearances

Broadcasting

Radio

MC

Variety show

Ambassador

Awards and nominations

References

External links 

 
 
 
 
 

1978 births
Living people
Brave Entertainment artists
IHQ (company) artists
Miss Korea winners
Miss Universe 2001 contestants
South Korean film actresses
South Korean television actresses
21st-century South Korean actresses
Yong In University alumni